Nassar Mansour (Arabic: نصّار منصور), (born February 2, 1967), is an artist, calligrapher, academic and designer in the field of Islamic Arts, specializing in Islamic Calligraphy. He is considered to be one of the most accomplished contemporary Arab calligraphers today.

Nassar is best known for his serious academic research on Islamic Calligraphy and for his academic and artistic efforts in reviving Muhaqqaq (one of the six classical scripts الخطوط الستة) as a successful artistic medium for contemporary Islamic calligraphers. Nassar was the first Jordanian to obtain the traditional Ijaza in calligraphy from the Islamic world's premier master calligrapher, Hasan Çelebi, in 2003, Istanbul. In April 2018, he was awarded The Artistic Creativity Award for his academic and artistic efforts in reviving Muhaqqaq script by the Arab Thought Foundation (ATF).

Biography 
Nassar was born in Amman, Jordan. He is the youngest son of the well-known Jordanian-Palestinian poet Muhammad Mansour Abu Mansour (1913-2000). His family came originally from Joureesh (جوريش), Nablus in Palestine, but Nassar has lived his entire life in Amman. He obtained his BA in Islamic studies, economics and statistics from the University of Jordan in 1988. Later in 1997, he graduated with an MA degree in Islamic Arts specializing in Islamic Calligraphy from Al al-Bayt University in Jordan. In 2007, Nassar was awarded a PhD in the Art of Islamic Calligraphy from the Prince's School of Traditional Arts (PSTA), London.

Academic and artistic career 

Nassar started his academic career straight after graduation as a lecturer (1988-1995) of Arabic Calligraphy at the Faculty of Education and the Language Centre at the University of Jordan. In 1998, he became a member of Al-Balqa` Applied University in Jordan where he contributed to the setting up of the Institute of Traditional Islamic Arts in 1998. This institute was responsible for the reconstruction of the twelfth-century Saladin's pulpit (minbar) (منبر صلاح الدين) which was later in 2006 installed in its original place at al-Aqsa Mosque in Jerusalem. Nassar was mainly in charge of redrawing and designing the entire inscriptions and ornamentation of the Minbar. Nassar lectured at the Prince's School of Traditional Arts from 2002 to 2007 when he was working on his PhD. Nassar currently is the professor of Islamic Calligraphy and Qur’anic manuscripts at the department of Islamic Arts, at the College of Islamic Arts and Architecture, W.I.S.E University, Jordan, and a researcher in The Islamic Manuscript Association (TIMA), Cambridge, project of cataloguing the Mamluk and Ilkhanid Qur’an manuscripts at Dar el-Kotob in Cairo.

Artworks and exhibitions 

Nassar's calligraphy works reflect the content and the meaning of the words and text, a style he has developed over the last 20 years of practice and research. His artworks demonstrate beauty and simplicity. His works are not limited to ink on paper, they extend to other media such as stone, ceramic, mosaic, glass, wood, metals and more.

Nassar's Art works are to be found at the permanent collections of many world museums such as: The British Museum in London, The Contemporary Museum of Calligraphy in Moscow, The Aga Khan Museum in Toronto, The Jordan National Gallery of Fine Arts in Amman and in many private collections around the world.  He has participated in numerous calligraphy conferences, workshops and exhibitions in the Middle East, Europe, USA, Australia, Canada, Pakistan, Malaysia, Iran, Russia and Japan.

Solo exhibitions references 

 2017 From the Heart to the Pen, Arabic Calligraphy Artworks, in collaboration with his pupil Sir Mark Allen, Calligraphy Museum, Sharjah.

 2017 HUWA, Arabic Calligraphy Artworks, Tabari ArtSpace, Dubai.
2010 Curated the exhibition “The Ultimate Journey” at the Jordan National Gallery of Fine Arts on the occasion of the celebration of al-Quds (Jerusalem) Capital of Arab Culture.
2007 “Muhaqqaq and More”, Arabic Calligraphy Artworks, The Prince's School of Traditional Arts Gallery, London.
2005 “Making of the Master”, the story of the Ijaza tradition in Islamic Calligraphy, curated by Nassar Mansour in corporation with Venetia Porter, The British Museum, London.
1998 Ahl al-Bayt, Jordan National Gallery of Fine Arts, Amman.

Selected group exhibitions 

 2017 “The 9th Dubai International Arabic Calligraphy Exhibition”, Dubai.
 2016 “The Human Image: Masterpieces of figurative art from The British Museum”, London.
 2015 “Islamic Art Now Contemporary Art of The Middle East“, LACMA Museum, LA.
 2014 “Muhaqqaq Script”, The Dubai Arabic Calligraphy Centre, Dubai.
 2013 “Words and Illumination”, Medina Municipality in cooperation with The British Museum, Madina.
 2013 “Illumination: The Light of Tradition”, The Gallery at Linlithgow Burgh Halls Scotland.
 2013 “The Ultimate Journey”, Knowledge Economic City, Madina.
 2013 “Word”, Mandeville Exhibition Space, London.
 2012 “The Ultimate Journey”, Dolmabahçe Art Gallery, Istanbul.
 2012 “Beauty and Belief”, BYU Museum of Art, Utah.
 2010 “The Ultimate Journey”, curated by Nassar Mansour in corporation with Layan Cultural Foundation, Jordan National Gallery of Fine Arts, Amman.
 2010 “The Future of Tradition-The Tradition of Future”, 100 Years after the Exhibition "Masterpieces of Muhammadan Art" in Munich, Haus der Kunst, Munich.
 2009 “The 1st International Calligraphy Exhibition”, Sokolniki Exhibition and Convention Centre, Moscow.
 2008 “The 2nd International Calligraphy Exhibition”, Academy of Arts, St. Petersburg.
 2008 “Word into Art: Artists of the Modern Middle East” from the collections of The British Museum, Dubai Financial Centre, Dubai.
 2006 “Word into Art: Artists of the Modern Middle East” The British Museum, London.
 2005 “A Building Tradition: The Work of The Prince’s School of Traditional Arts”, The National Building Museum, Washington, DC.
 2004 “Arabic Script: Mightier than the Sword”, by the Islamic Arts Museum of KL and The British Museum, Kuala Lumpur.
 2003 “Arabic Script: Mightier than the Sword”, from the collections of The British Museum, Ian Potter Museum of Art, University of Melbourne, Australia.

Selected public artwork 

 2012 The Inscriptions of al-Risala Mosque, Amman.
 2003 The Inscriptions of the Arab Army Martyrs Mausoleum, Irbid, Jordan.
 2002 The Statue of ‘Ahl al-‘Azm, stone, Amman.
 1998 The Statue of Amman, stone and mosaic, Amman.
 1998 The Architectural Inscriptioens and Ornamentations of al-Balqa’ Applied University Gate, Al-Salt, Jordan
 1996-1999 Designing the Calligraphy Inscriptions and Ornamentations of the Twelfth-Century Saladin's Pulpit (minbar), al-Aqsa Mosque/Jerusalem.
 1995-2000 Designing the Calligraphy and Ornamentations of the Jordanian Currency, Coins and Banknotes, Central Bank of Jordan, Amman.

Artwork quotes 
“If you come from a tradition that has renounced representation in religious context, such as Islam (there are no image in the Koran or in mosque), how do you-how can you-shape that thinking through Art? Nassar Mansour's Kun shows exactly the same moment of creation as represented in Michelangelo, but graphically. The Qur’an describes the moment of creation as “He said to him, ‘Be!’ and it was.” The artist, instead of showing the event, shows us the Word of the Arabic script itself; Kun is the Arabic for “be”. The creation of humanity. The continuing word. A totally different way of imagining ourselves. Neil MacGregor, Director of The British Museum (2002 to 2015).

“Mansour is a khattat, a calligrapher who not only writes the basmala well but who "has dedicated his life to the service of beautiful writing, the essence of the meaning of the word calligraphy", according to Venetia Porter, Assistant Keeper (Curator), Islamic and Contemporary Middle East Department, The British Museum.

Sir Mark Allen wrote: "Mansour is notable for the mission we see in his art and his writing to give new life to the venerable Muhaqqaq script, one of the six classical scripts of Arabic calligraphy”.

“I studied calligraphy for a few months with Nassar Mansour, a Jordanian artist, a very serious and exacting teacher. I was only able to study erratically, but it gave me neuromas admiration for these artists and the traditions in which they work”. Vikram Seth, Trustee of The British Museum.

“Kun is an extraordinarily elegant and powerful graphic work, and obviously very much part of the Arabic tradition of calligraphy which goes back 1,500 years or so. But you do not have to be able to read Arabic to enjoy it –this is just a beautiful abstract design. The fact that it is a wird adds a punch”. David Barrie, Director, The Art Fund UK.

Publications

Books 

 Amshaq al-Khatt al-Muhaqqaq  (أمشاق الخط المحقق), (in Arabic, English, Turkish and Persian), 2017, The Royal Hashemite Documentation Centre (RHDC), Amman.
 Flowers of Devotion, Asma-e-Rasool-e-Kareem, Painting and Calligraphy Devoted to the Prophet Mohammad, collaboration work with Neyyar Ehsan Rashid (in English, Arabic and Urdu), 2017, Lahore, Pakistan.
 Sacred Script; Muhaqqaq in Islamic Calligraphy, (in English), 2011, I. B. Tauris & Co Ltd, London, New York,.
 Al-Ijaza fi Fann al-Khatt al-‘Arabi, (in Arabic), 2000, Dar Majdalawi for Publishing and Distribution, Amman.

Chapters in books 

 “Arabic Calligraphy”, Arts and Crafts of the Islamic Lands, ed. Khaled Azzam, (in English), 2013, Thames and Hudson, London, New York.
 “The Role of Muhaqqaq Script in Copying the Qur’anic Manuscripts”, (in Arabic), Research and Studies Dedicated to Muhammad ‘Adnan al-Bakhit on the Occasion of his Seventieth Birthday, ed. Mohammad A. Khuraisat, 2013, University of Jordan, Amman. pp. 371-420.
 “Arabic Calligraphy”, The Complete Guide To Calligraphy, (in English), 2006, CICO Books, London, New York, pp. 164-179.
 “The Tradition of Ijaza in Arabic Calligraphy”, (in Arabic), “Studies in the History of Damascus in Honour of Yusuf Ibish, ed. Muhammad ‘Adnan al-Bakhit, 2006, Al-Furqan Foundation for Islamic Heritage, London, pp. 359-416.

Academic articles 

 Tawqi’ and Riqa’, Preliminary Observations, (in Arabic), 2018.
 Yaqut al-Musta’simi, Analytical Study of the Technical Characteristics of his Method in Rayhani Script, (in Arabic), 2018, Jordan Journal of History and Archaeology.
 With others, The Inscriptions of King Abdullah I Mosque and their Relationship with the Place (in Arabic), 2013, Jordan Journal of Arts, 6/3, pp. 379-392.
 With others, Nasta'liq Script, Historic Roots and Artistic Characteristics (in Arabic), 2013, Jordan Journal of Arts, 6/1, pp. 259-278.
 With others, The Inscriptions of al-Aqsa Mosque Minbar (Pulpit), and its Historical and Artistic Significance (in Arabic), 2013, Journal of the Faculty of Archaeology, Cairo University.
 With others, Natural Stone in Jordan: Characteristics, Specifications and Importance in Interior Architecture (in English), American Journal of Scientific Research, 82, 2012, pp. 83–94.
 "A Unique Qur’an Manuscript Copied by Abdullah al-Sayrafi (d. after 746H/1345-6 AD); The Artistic Features of the Calligraphy of Abdullah al-Sayrafi: An Analytical Study” (in Arabic), Jordan Journal of History and Archaeology, 6/1, 2012, pp. 78–104.
 “ A Unique Arabic Manuscript Copied by Yaqut al-Nuri al-Mosuli (d. 618H/1221 AD); Analytical Study of the Artistic Features of Yaqut al- Musili’s Style in Calligraphy" (in Arabic), Jordan Journal of History and Archaeology, 2009, 3/3, pp. 1–32.

External links
 Kun I (Be) Black ink and gold leaf drawing on muraqqa paper, signed and dated in Arabic; calligraphic composition with the Arabic word كن (kun) in kufic script.
 Contemporary Museum of Calligraphy
 http://www.britishmuseum.org/research/search_the_collection_database/term_details.aspx?bioId=31440
 http://www.calligraphy-museum.com/en/participants/jo/Nassar_Mansour
 http://www.bagrifoundation.org/media/drnassarmansour/
 https://www.facebook.com/NassarM/
 https://www.tabariartspace.com/blogs/exhibitions/nassar-mansour
 http://royalasiaticsociety.org/tag/dr-nassar-mansour/
 https://scholar.google.com/citations?user=IUXeXwIAAAAJ&hl=en
 https://www.bibalex.org/en/events/eventdetails?id=48756

Living people
21st-century Jordanian poets
Calligraphers of Arabic script
1967 births
20th-century Jordanian poets